Devichamal is a village in the Karmala taluka of Solapur district in Maharashtra state, India.

Demographics
Covering  and comprising 438 households at the time of the 2011 census of India, Devichamal had a population of 2034. There were 1072 males and 962 females, with 279 people being aged six or younger.

References

Villages in Karmala taluka